Nicholas Joseph LaLota (born June 23, 1978) is an American politician and businessman. A member of the Republican Party, he represents  in the United States House of Representatives since 2023.

Early life and career
LaLota was born on June 23, 1978, and is from Bay Shore, New York. He graduated from St. Anthony's High School and, in 2000, from the United States Naval Academy. He served in the U.S. Navy for eight years, serving three overseas deployments. He earned a Master of Business Administration and a Juris Doctor from Hofstra University. LaLota served as chief of staff to Suffolk County Presiding Officer Kevin McCaffrey. He also served on the Suffolk Board of Elections as well as a trustee for the village of Amityville, New York.

U.S. House of Representatives

2022 election 

LaLota ran for the United States House of Representatives in the first congressional district of New York to succeed Lee Zeldin, who ran for governor of New York. He won the general election on November 8 by defeating the Democratic nominee Bridget Fleming.

On December 27, LaLota became one of the first Republicans to call for a full House Ethics Committee investigation into the false claims made by his fellow Long Island Republican, representative-elect George Santos. "New Yorkers deserve the truth and House Republicans deserve an opportunity to govern without this distraction", LaLota said.

Caucus memberships 
 Republican Main Street Partnership

Personal life
LaLota married his high school sweetheart, Kaylie, who is a teacher at Northport High School. They have three daughters. LaLota resides in Amityville.

References

External links
 Congressman Nick LaLota official U.S. House website
 Campaign website
 
 

|-

1978 births
Hofstra University alumni
Living people
New York (state) Republicans
Republican Party members of the United States House of Representatives from New York (state)
United States Naval Academy alumni